Plaza Suite is a comedy play by Neil Simon.

Plot
The play is composed of three acts, each involving different characters but all set in Suite 719 of New York City's Plaza Hotel. The first act, Visitor From Mamaroneck, introduces the audience to not-so-blissfully wedded couple Sam and Karen Nash, who are revisiting their honeymoon suite in an attempt by Karen to bring the love back into their marriage. Her plan backfires and the two become embroiled in a heated argument about whether or not Sam is having an affair with his secretary. The act ends with Sam leaving (allegedly to attend to urgent business) and Karen sadly reflecting on how much things have changed since they were young.

The second act, Visitor from Hollywood, involves a meeting between movie producer Jesse Kiplinger and his old flame, suburban housewife Muriel Tate. Muriel—aware of his reputation as a smooth-talking ladies' man—has come for nothing more than a chat between old friends, promising herself she will not stay too long. Jesse, however, has other plans in mind and repeatedly attempts to seduce her.

The third act, Visitor from Forest Hills, revolves around married couple Roy and Norma Hubley on their daughter Mimsey's wedding day. In a rush of nervousness, Mimsey has locked herself in the suite's bathroom and refuses to leave. Her parents make frantic attempts to cajole her into attending her wedding while the gathered guests await the trio's arrival downstairs. It appears that they will finally get married, as the act ends.

Background
The play originally had four acts, one of which was cut during pre-production. Simon later expanded it for the 1970 feature film The Out-of-Towners.

Productions
Before its Broadway run, Plaza Suite premiered in 1968 at the Shubert Theatre in New Haven and the Colonial Theatre in Boston. Plaza Suite opened on Broadway at the Plymouth Theatre on February 14, 1968 and closed on October 3, 1970 after 1097 performances and two previews. Directed by Mike Nichols, the cast featured George C. Scott and Maureen Stapleton who appeared in each of the three acts with Bob Balaban in two acts. Clive Barnes in his review for The New York Times wrote that "after a slow start with the first, warms up with the second and ends with an all-stops-out, grandstand finish with the third." Later in the run, they were replaced by Dan Dailey, E. G. Marshall, Don Porter, Nicol Williamson, Barbara Baxley, and Peggy Cass.

The play was profiled in the William Goldman book The Season: A Candid Look at Broadway. Noël Coward, who three years earlier had written Suite in Three Keys, later said of Plaza Suite, "Such a good idea having different plays all played in a hotel suite! I wonder where Neil Simon got it from?"

Mike Nichols won the Tony Award for Best Direction of a Play. Neil Simon was nominated for the Tony Award for Best Play but lost to Tom Stoppard for Rosencrantz and Guildenstern Are Dead. Maureen Stapleton was nominated for the Tony Award for Best Performance by a Leading Actress in a Play but lost to Zoe Caldwell in The Prime of Miss Jean Brodie.

A West Coast production, with engagements in San Francisco and Los Angeles, opened on September 16, 1968. It starred Dan Dailey and Lee Grant. The production closed March 1, 1969.

The play's first national tour, starring Forrest Tucker and Betty Garrett and Dana Ivey in the supporting female roles, opened on October 7, 1968. Replacement actors included Howard Keel and Larry Parks. Among the tour's stops was Chicago for a nearly eight-month engagement. It concluded on February 14, 1970 in Philadelphia.

Garrett and Parks, married in real life, starred in a bus and truck tour that lasted from October 16, 1970 through April 25, 1971.

A Broadway revival was initially set to play at the Hudson Theatre, beginning with previews on March 13, 2020 and officially on April 13, following a pre-Broadway run at the Colonial Theatre in Boston in February 2020. However, due to the closure of Broadway houses caused by the COVID-19 pandemic, the Broadway run was postponed. In June 2021, it was reported that the production would begin preview performances on February 25, 2022 and officially open on March 28. The production stars Matthew Broderick and Sarah Jessica Parker and is directed by John Benjamin Hickey. In April 2022, the production temporarily paused performances after both Broderick and Parker tested positive for COVID-19. The revival was initially set to close on June 28, 2022, but its run was later extended to July 10 of that year to compensate for cancelled performances.

Film adaptations
Simon adapted his play for a 1971 film starring Walter Matthau, Stapleton, Barbara Harris, and Lee Grant, but he was unhappy with the outcome. He felt the conceit of one actor playing the lead role in all three acts worked on stage but not on screen, especially if the actor was Matthau, who he felt was the right choice only for the beleaguered father-of-the-bride, Roy Hubley.

On December 31, 1982, HBO broadcast a production (shot in front of a live audience) starring Lee Grant and Jerry Orbach playing all three roles.

In 1987, Carol Burnett starred in a television movie in which she portrayed all three female roles. Starring opposite her were Hal Holbrook as Sam Nash, Dabney Coleman as Jesse Kiplinger, and Richard Crenna as Roy Hubley. Burnett was also the executive producer with direction by Roger Beatty and Kenny Solms.

References

Sources

External links

 
  (archive)

1968 plays
Broadway plays
American plays adapted into films
Plays by Neil Simon
Plays set in New York City
Works set in hotels